People of the Ditch (Arabic: أصحاب الأخدود) is a story mentioned in Surah Al-Burooj of the Qur'an. It is about people who were thrown into a ditch and set afire, due to their belief in Allah.

Story in Suratul-Buruj 
The verses 4 to 7 are the story of a group of devout people, who were burned in a ditch. The main text and English translation of the verses are in the following table:

Then the Qur'an adds that they were killed in this way only because they believed in Allah. Then it mentioned the fate of torturers in verses 8 to 10:

Meaning of 'Ukhdud' 
According to the Al-Mufradat fi Gharib al-Quran, "Ukhdud" is basically derived from "Khadd", and it means "wide and deep ditch spread on the land." It is called this because it is believed to be where the burning took place.

Time and place of the event 
The event of Al-Ukhdud occurred in 520 or 523 ACE, in the time of Dhu Nuwas, the last Himyarite King.

Story in other sources 
There are different stories about the people of the Ditch. One of them is a hadith ('account', 'narration' or 'report') about a Malik (King) that had a sahir (magician) in the days before Muhammad. As the magician grew old and his lifetime was nearly over, he asked the King to choose a smart boy to learn sihr (magic) from him. However, as the boy was training in magic, he met a monk everyday on the way to the magic class, and finally became a true believer in God. As a result, he could save people and treat sick people in unusual ways. When the King learned of this, he commanded the boy to abandon his faith in God. The boy rejected the King's command, so he was killed. The King also burned those who followed the boy's deen (religion), in one or more ditches.

Ibn Ishaq-Guillaume interpreted this passage to be an allusion to the killing of the Christians of Najran by order of the King Dhu Nuwas. According to Christian sources, this event took place around 523 C.E. Dhu Nuwas converted to Judaism and chose Joseph as his new name. He went to Najran to force the Christian people there to convert to Judaism. When they refused, the King threw them alive into one or more burning ditches.

There is also a hadith that God chose a Nabi (Prophet) in Abyssinia, but the people of Abyssinia denied him. At last the prophet and his companions were burned in a ditch.

It is reported that companions of Daniyal (Daniel)  were burned in a ditch   Some say it happened several times in several places such as Yemen, Constantinople, Babylon, Iraq, and Al-Sham; and that this story is not about just one such event.

In media 
The animated film, The Boy and the King, is a movie about people of the ditch.

See also 
 ʿĀd
 People of Lut (Lot)
 People of Ya-Sin
 Thamud
 The Pharaoh of the Exodus
 Verse of Ikmal al-Din
 Verse of Loan
 The verse of Wilayah
 The Verse of Brotherhood
 Verse of Purification
 Hadith of warning
 Verse of Evil Eye
 Verse of Obedience
 Muhammad in the Quran
 The Battle of Karbala

References 

Quranic verses
Ditch